The Sara Cohen School in Rutherford Street, Caversham, Dunedin is a special needs school in New Zealand.

The Sara Cohen School was established in 1926. This school caters for special needs pupils from primary school age through adulthood, or ages 5 to 21. The school was named for the late wife of Mark Cohen, city councillor, campaigner for women's rights, and editor of the Evening Star newspaper from 1893 to 1920. In 1889, Mark Cohen was a major figure behind the founding of New Zealand's first kindergarten.

References 

Schools in Dunedin
Special schools in New Zealand